Cherokee County Courthouse may refer to:

Cherokee County Courthouse (Georgia), Canton, Georgia
Cherokee County Courthouse (Iowa), Cherokee, Iowa
Cherokee County Courthouse (Kansas), Baxter Springs, Kansas
Cherokee County Courthouse (North Carolina), Murphy, North Carolina